I Can't Get Over You may refer to:

 "I Can't Get Over You" (Brooks & Dunn song), 1998
 "I Can't Get Over You", a bonus track from the 1966 album Black Monk Time by The Monks, B-side of single "Cuckoo"
 "I Can't Get Over You", a song from the 1976 Dramatics album, Joy Ride
 "I Can't Get Over You", a song from the 1981 Gap Band album, Gap Band IV
 "I Can't Get Over You", a song from the 2006 Linda Ronstadt and Ann Savoy album, Adieu False Heart
 "I Can't Get Over You", a song by Shane Filan from the 2015 album Right Here
 "I Can't Get Over You (Getting over Me)", a 1983 song by Bandana (country band)
 "Ooh La La (I Can't Get Over You)", a 1990 song by American R&B trio Perfect Gentlemen

See also
"Can't Get Over You", a 1989 song by Maze
"Can't Get Over You", a 1986 song by Shara Nelson
"Can't Get Over You", a song by Joji from his 2018 album Ballads 1